Dr. Eduardo Stein Barillas (born 20 October 1946) is a  Guatemalan diplomat who served as the Vice President of Guatemala from 14 January 2004 to 14 January 2008, serving a concurrent four-year mandate with  President Óscar Berger. He is currently the Joint Special Representative of the UN High Commissioner for Refugees and the International Organization for Migration for Venezuelan refugees and migrants.

Prior to his election, he held a number of positions with the International Organization for Migration, the United Nations Development Programme, and the Organization of American States. He also served as  Minister of Foreign Affairs under President Álvaro Arzú from 14 January 1996 to 14 January 2000.

Eduardo Stein is a Member of the Global Leadership Foundation, a not-for-profit organisation that offers, discreetly and confidentially, a range of experienced advisors to political leaders facing difficult situations. Stein is a member of the Inter-American Dialogue.

On 19 September 2018, Stein was appointed Joint Special Representative of the UN High Commissioner for Refugees and the International Organization for Migration for Venezuelan refugees and migrants.

References

External links
"A Man of Compassion" (magazine of Northwestern University, Illinois, United States)

1945 births
Living people
Crecer politicians
Guatemalan people of German descent
Guatemalan politicians
Members of the Inter-American Dialogue
Vice presidents of Guatemala